No Sé Si es Baires o Madrid (Don't Know if it is 'Buenos Aires' or Madrid) is the third live album by Argentinian recording artist Fito Páez. Released by RCA Records on June 23, 2009, it was recorded before a live audience at the Palacio de los Congresos in Madrid, Spain, on April 24, 2008. The album includes featured performances by Pereza, Diego del Morao, Sabú, Dani Noel, Joaquín Sabina, Pablo Milanés, Ariel Rot, Gala Évora, Marlango, Mavi Díaz and Coki.

To promote the album, Páez released "Contigo", a duet with Joaquín Sabina, which was their first joint performance in ten years.  They recorded Enemigos Intimos in 1998. The album received positive reviews, earned Páez a Latin Grammy for Best Male Pop Vocal Album, and was certified gold in Argentina.

Background
Fito Páez recorded No Sé Si es Baires o Madrid, his third live album, following Euforia (1999) and Mi Vida con Ellas (2005), at the Palacio de los Congresos in Madrid on April 24, 2008. Initially, Páez did not plan to release the performance for sale, but after realizing that "the show was beautiful", opted for the release. The album title is a phrase from the song "Petalo de Sal", included on Páez' El Amor Después del Amor, and also from the singer's sentiment of having Joaquín Sabina share the stage with him. Sabina and Páez recorded Enemigos Intimos in 1998, with both singers' fighting during the album recording sessions.  Afterward Sabina did not speak to Páez for more than 10 years. After their reconciliation in Argentina, they played together in some concerts, and when Paez' team made phone calls to see who wanted to participate in the album, Sabina agreed.

Repertoire
Páez recorded the album alone on-stage with his piano; half the selections are duets with Spanish and Cuban performers. Eight tracks are taken from El Amor Después del Amor (the title track, "Dos Días en la Vida", "Pétalo de Sal", "Un Vestido y un Amor", "Tumbas de la Gloria", "La Rueda Mágica", "Creo", "Brillante Sobre el Mic"); "Mariposa Tecknicolor" from Circo Beat; "11 y 6" and "Dar es Dar" were first included on Euforia; "Al Lado del Camino" was recorded for Abre; "Contigo" is a song written by Joaquín Sabina.

Reception

The album received positive reviews. Mariano Prunes of Allmusic said that Páez's rethinking of his own work is always worthy of attention, and the album is "an evening with the singer, his piano, his (Madrid) friends, and his songs." Prunes also praised "Contigo", a duet with Joaquín Sabina, and "Yo Vengo a Ofrecer Mi Corazón" with Pablo Milanés.  He said Páez's creative and intriguing readings of his classics keeps things interesting, while his guests compound the emotional effect of the performance. Páez earned a Latin Grammy for Best Male Pop Vocal Album. No Sé Si es Baires o Madrid received a gold certification in Argentina.

Track listing
This track listing adapted from Allmusic and liner notes.

Personnel
 Fito Páez – main performer, producer, vocals, lyricist, composer
 Carlos Garcia – art coordinator, producer
 Carlos Altolaguirre –	sound engineer
 Alejandro Avalis – production coordination
 Gustavo Borner – mastering
 Carlos Martos Wensell – engineer
 Paco Martin – A&R
 Rafa Vila – A&R
 Alejandro Ros – graphic design
 Rubén Martín – photography

Source:

References

2009 live albums
Fito Páez live albums
RCA Records live albums
Spanish-language live albums
Latin Grammy Award for Best Male Pop Vocal Album